Patrick Hennessy may refer to:

 Patrick Hennessy (journalist) (born 1963), British journalist
 Patrick Hennessy (painter) (1915–1980), Irish artist
 Sir Patrick Hennessy (industrialist) (1898–1981), Irish-born British industrialist

See also
 Patrick Hennessey (trade unionist), Irish trade unionist and political radical
 Patrick Hennessey (barrister) (born 1982), British barrister and author
 Hennessy (surname)
 Hennessey (disambiguation)